Werneburg is a surname. Notable people with the surname include:

 Joachim Werneburg (born 1953), German poet
  (1813–1886), German local scientist and scientist of forestry